Daniel Pineda may refer to:

 Daniel Pineda (athlete) (born 1985), Chilean track and field athlete
 Daniel Pineda (fighter) (born 1985), American mixed martial artist
 Daniel Pineda (archer)  (born 1993), Colombian archer